"The Lightning Saga" is a comic book crossover story arc that took place in DC Comics' two flagship team books: Justice League of America and Justice Society of America. It was written by Brad Meltzer and Geoff Johns, and illustrated by Ed Benes, Dale Eaglesham, and Shane Davis. It is notable for re-introducing the Legion of Super-Heroes in the post-Infinite Crisis era.

This crossover would also be the beginning of DC's three year reinvention of the Legion, with the next part occurring in the Action Comics story "Superman and the Legion of Super-Heroes" and culminating in Final Crisis: Legion of Three Worlds.

Story
A captured villain, Trident, is under the control of a Starro drone. Batman performs a DNA scan, and discovers that it is really Karate Kid of the Legion of Super-Heroes. Karate Kid awakens, and fights Batman, almost defeating him, until Black Lightning steps in. Meanwhile, Starman reveals to the JSA that he is also from the future.

Batman, Sandman and Geo-Force are called to Arkham Asylum, where Doctor Destiny is manipulating Dream Girl into creating horrific illusions. Starman manages to free her by saying "Lightning Lad" in Interlac. Dream Girl then reveals that there are other Legionnaires in the present. The JSA and JLA decide to team up and search for the time-displaced Legion members.

Superman, Stargirl, Cyclone, and Red Tornado go to the Fortress of Solitude where they discover Wildfire, frozen among statues of various Legion members (Superman has the statues because, for the first time since John Byrne's The Man of Steel (1986) reboot of the Superman mythos, he is described as a member of the Legion since his youth). When Superman says "Lightning Lad", Wildfire unfreezes and disgorges what looks like Batman's Utility Belt from within his body. At the Batcave, Batman, Starman and Black Lightning talk to Karate Kid, who is insisting that he is a member of the Trident Guild, until Starman says "The Magic Words" and his memory is restored.

Jay Garrick, Vixen, Hal Jordan, Ted Grant and Tom Bronson enter Gorilla City, where they find Timber Wolf and restore his memory. Meanwhile, Red Arrow, Power Girl, Hawkman and Hawkgirl head for Thanagar in search of Dawnstar only to find that she has already left for Earth. The rest of the Legion members remove miniature lightning rods from the utility belt and proclaim "One of us has to die". Superman finds one of the rods and realizes they are planning a "Russian Roulette", just as they once did to restore Lightning Lad to life, though at the expense of one of their own lives.

The JSA and JLA converge at the old Secret Society of Super Villains base in Slaughter Swamp, looking for the final Legionnaire, whom they believe to be Triplicate Girl, and are attacked by a rogue mechanism named Computo. As they battle, Superman realizes that he has been through a battle exactly like it before and realizes it to be the work of his old future friend Projectra, aka: Sensor Girl. Before anyone can do anything she is rescued by her fellow Legion members and they fly off into a lightning cloud.

While the Society races to stop the Legionnaires, intercepting each of their positions, Batman and Hal Jordan recognize them as the place Barry Allen gained his powers, the mansion where he appeared to Batman during the Crisis on Infinite Earths, and Titans Tower. Despite the Society and League's best efforts, the Legion's plan goes ahead, with Karate Kid being the one struck by lightning, only just surviving the bolt. Within the crater caused by the strike are Wally West (The Flash), his wife Linda and their two children, who returned from the Speed Force by "riding" the lightning. The Legion return to the future, except for Starman, who says that he is needed (see: Final Crisis: Legion of Three Worlds), and Karate Kid, who is joined in the present by one of Triplicate Girl's 3 bodies. In the 31st century, Brainiac 5 dismisses Wally's return as a side effect, stating that they got who they wanted. A close-up of the lightning rod Karate Kid was using shows it to have someone trapped inside.

Aftermath
This story also contains a subplot in which the Ultra-Humanite's brain is removed from the body of Delores Winters and taken to the future by Per Degaton and Despero, where the brain is placed into a new albino ape body somewhere within Gorilla City. These events later resume in The All-New Booster Gold (vol. 2) series, where the three of them are plotting to erase the heroes of the present by tampering with the timeline of the past via time travel technology.

As illustrated in the special All-Flash #1 issue (one-shot), at nearly the exact moment lightning struck the rod and Wally West returned with his family, the then-Flash Bart Allen was killed by Inertia and the Rogues. It was later revealed that Bart was, in fact, the person that the Legion "wanted". Therefore, trapping him in the lightning was the only way he could later be resurrected back through the rod in his own proper, future time-line (as seen in Final Crisis: Legion of Three Worlds #3).

A follow-up storyline, Superman and the Legion of Super-Heroes (Action Comics #858–863), ties up some of the loose ends presented in this storyline, such as why the Legion never visited Superman again after the original first Crisis.

The "Lightning Saga" ramifications reach its penultimate chapter in Final Crisis: Legion of Three Worlds, followed by the subsequent return of Superboy (Conner Kent or Kon-El), which takes place in Adventure Comics (2009) #0, 1–3 & 6-7 (legacy numbering of #504–506 & 509–10), where another Legionnaire named Element Lad resurfaces in Smallville as Conner's science teacher. The "Lightning Saga" then takes its final twist into Superman: Last Stand of New Krypton (originally named "Brainiac and the Legion of Superheroes") where it concludes in its entirety, revealing its final secrets in Adventure Comics #514 (May 2010), while Karate Kid and Triplicate Girl's further 21st century adventures are detailed in the Countdown to Final Crisis series.

Collected editions
The Lightning Saga, as well as three additional issues of Justice League of America (#0, 11–12) were collected in the hardcover volume Justice League of America Volume 2: The Lightning Saga, which was released in 2008. The collection features a written introduction by actor and comedian Patton Oswalt.

References

External links

Comics about time travel
Justice Society of America
Comics by Brad Meltzer
Comics by Geoff Johns